The Ukrainian Open is a senior international figure skating competition. The inaugural event was held in December 2013 in Kyiv. Not held in the following two seasons, the event was scheduled to return 9–13 November 2016 as part of the ISU Challenger Series but the International Skating Union listed the event as cancelled on 20 September. Medals may be awarded in the disciplines of men's and ladies' singles, pair skating, and ice dancing.

In 2013, the event also served as the national championships of Ukraine. The three highest-placing Ukrainian entries in each discipline formed their national podiums.

Senior medalists

Men

Ladies

Pairs

Ice dancing

References

External links 
 Official site of the Ukrainian Open  
 Ukrainian Figure Skating Federation 
 International Skating Union

International figure skating competitions hosted by Ukraine
ISU Challenger Series